Moulineaux is a commune in the Seine-Maritime department in the Normandy region in northern France.

History
During the Franco-Prussian War of December 1870 - January 1871 its garrison fought off a siege by 20,000 Prussians led by Edwin von Manteuffel.

Geography
The A13 autoroute passes through the commune's territory.

Population

Places of interest
 The church of St. Jacques, dating from the thirteenth century.
 Remains of the eleventh-century castle of Robert le Diable, also housing a museum.
 The Caradas manorhouse and St. Jean's chapel at Fontaines.
 A sixteenth century chapel.
 The Château de La Vacherie, dating from the seventeenth century.

See also
Communes of the Seine-Maritime department

References

External links

Photos of the château de Robert le Diable 
 Site de la mairie 
 Moulineaux sur le site de l'Institut géographique national 

Communes of Seine-Maritime